The IMG Center is a modernist styled 1965-built 180 foot 16 story high-rise in downtown Cleveland's Nine-Twelve District. It sits at the prominent Cleveland intersection of East Ninth and St. Clair. The building is named after the 1960 Cleveland founded firm International Management Group or IMG.  There is a "nub" on top of the building that can be seen in all directions that bears the IMG logo. The distinctive look of the building is due its use of glass in its corners in lieu of solid corner supports. At the time of its construction the building cost $7 Million dollars and was considered a fine example of modernist skyscraper construction.

IMG Moves Out
The structure was the home of the Cleveland-based Cuyahoga Savings Bank, which was also known as One Erieview Plaza as it was a part of the Erieview plan until it was renamed the IMG Center in 1997. The company is known for its management of sports and athletic endeavors. IMG is now headquartered in New York City but their flagship office has been retained in downtown Cleveland.
Originally, leaving Cleveland for New York was not the plan, in fact, Mark McCormack, a company marketing agent and the founder of the firm, offered this in 1989,

This proved to not matter in the end, as IMG left Cleveland for New York in the 2000s. However, IMG explained this was a marketing reach process and clientele availability necessity rather than a snub against the company's home base for so many years. New York just made more sense strategically.

See also
 List of tallest buildings in Cleveland
 Downtown Cleveland

References

Skyscraper office buildings in Cleveland
Modernist architecture in Ohio
Office buildings completed in 1965